St. Ignatius is one of the largest Catholic parishes in Ohio. The school has over 1,000 students.

External links

Catholic Church in Ohio
Schools in Ohio
Catholic schools in Ohio